The 2021–22 season is the 31st season of competitive association football in Ukraine since dissolution of the Soviet Union.

The Ukrainian Premier League and other sporting competitions were suspended on 26 February 2022 following the Russian invasion of Ukraine and declaration of martial law in the country.

National teams

Ukraine national football team

Friendlies

2022 FIFA World Cup

Group D

Ukraine U-21 national football team

UEFA European Under-21 Championship

Ukraine women's national football team

UEFA Women's Euro 2022

UEFA competitions

UEFA Champions League

UEFA Europa League

UEFA Conference Cup

UEFA Youth League

UEFA Champions League Path

Domestic Champions Path

UEFA Women's Champions League

Qualifying round

Men's club football

Note: For all scratched clubs, see section Clubs removed for more details

Location map 
The following displays the location of teams.

Number of teams by region

Premier League

PFL League 1 (First League)

PFL League 2 (Second League)

Group A

Group B

Cup competitions

Ukrainian Cup

Super Cup

Women's club football

 Kryvbas Kryvyi Rih and Nika Mykolaiv signed a partnership agreement, after which Kryvbas entered top tier, while Nika started at the second.

Note: For the scratched club, see section Clubs removed for more details

Vyshcha Liha

Managerial changes 
This is a list of managerial changes among Ukrainian professional football clubs:

Clubs removed 
 Obolon-2
 Volyn-2
 FC Cherkashchyna
 Karpaty Lviv
 Bukovynska Nadiya

Notes

References 

 
Seasons in Ukrainian football
2021 sport-related lists
2022 sport-related lists